Claude Boucher Davidson (October 13, 1896 – April 18, 1956) was an American Major League Baseball second baseman. He played for the Philadelphia Athletics during the  season and the Washington Senators during the  season.

References

External links

1896 births
1956 deaths
Major League Baseball second basemen
Philadelphia Athletics players
Washington Senators (1901–1960) players
New Haven Weissmen players
New Haven Indians players
Baseball players from Boston